George Frederick Langbein (June 29, 1842 Hirschhorn am Neckar, Grand Duchy of Hesse – May 27, 1911 Howells, Orange County, New York) was an American lawyer and politician from New York.

Life
The family emigrated to the United States in 1846, and settled in New York City. He graduated from Grammar School No. 19 in 1855. Then he studied law, was admitted to the bar in 1863, and practiced in New York City in partnership with his brother, Assemblyman J. C. Julius Langbein (1846–1910).

On January 23, 1886, his 21-year-old son George F. Langbein Jr. shot himself dead. The authorities believed in suicide, the parents in an accident.

Langbein was a member of the New York State Assembly (New York County, 10th D.) in 1887.

He was a member of the New York State Senate (7th D.) in 1888 and 1889.

Sources
 The New York Red Book compiled by Edgar L. Murlin (published by James B. Lyon, Albany NY, 1897; pg. 403 and 505)
 A BULLET IN HIS BRAIN in NYT on January 24, 1886
 Biographical sketches of the members of the Legislature in The Evening Journal Almanac (1888)
 Fourth Annual Record of Assemblymen and Senators from the City of New York in the State Legislature published by the City Reform Club (1889; pg. 79ff)
 DIED; LANGBEIN — Suddenly, May 27, 1911, George F. Langbein... in NYT on May 28, 1911

1842 births
1911 deaths
Democratic Party New York (state) state senators
Politicians from New York City
Democratic Party members of the New York State Assembly
Hessian emigrants to the United States
People from Bergstraße (district)
19th-century American politicians
Lawyers from New York City
19th-century American lawyers